{{DISPLAYTITLE:C6H4(OH)2}}
The molecular formula C6H4(OH)2 (molar mass: 110.11 g/mol, exact mass: 110.0368 u) may refer to:

 Catechol, or pyrocatechol
 Hydroquinone, also known as benzene-1,4-diol or quinol
 Resorcinol